John Paul II University may refer to:

 Pontifical University of John Paul II, Crackow, Poland
 John Paul II Catholic University of Lublin, Poland